Roy Stanley Jackson (1895–1964) was an Australian politician and a member of the New South Wales Legislative Assembly  for a single term between 1953 and 1956. He was a member of the Labor Party (ALP).

Jackson was born in  Balmain, New South Wales and was the son of a trade union organizer.  He was educated to elementary level in state schools and initially worked as a shipwright. During World War One he served with the First Australian Imperial Force in the Middle East and France. He joined the Federated Shipwrights and Ship Constructors' Association of Australia and became a full-time official with the union after 1934. He was also a member of the executive committee of the Australian Council of Trade Unions. Jackson was elected to parliament as the Labor member for Drummoyne at the 1953 election. He defeated the incumbent Liberal member Robert Dewley in an election in which Labor made significant gains in marginal seats. At the 1956 election Labor's vote dropped because of divisions within the federal Labor Party and the formation of the DLP. As a result, Jackson lost the seat to the Liberal party's Walter Lawrence. He unsuccessfully re-contested the seat at the 1959 election and retired from public life after his defeat. He did not hold party, parliamentary or ministerial office.

References

 

1895 births
1964 deaths
Members of the New South Wales Legislative Assembly
Australian shipwrights
Australian Labor Party members of the Parliament of New South Wales
20th-century Australian politicians